Mount Dale is a mountain in Western Australia about  east of Armadale in the Shire of Beverley.

It is best known for its walk track, which forms part of the Bibbulmun Track. The track leads from a parking and picnic area to the summit, passing through  of jarrah forest, which is coloured by a host of wildflowers in spring. South of Mundaring Weir, Mount Dale is visible when looking south-southeast from Glen Forrest outside Helena College on Bilgoman Road.

Mount Dale was once the site of a fire lookout tower as it provides almost uninterrupted 360° views over the National Park and surrounding State Forest areas.

This has now been replaced by a communications tower which obstructs the 360° panorama, though the footings of the old lookout tower and associated equipment are still visible among the undergrowth and stunning panoramic views are available from the parking area just below the peak. It was named after Ensign (later Lieutenant) Robert Dale, who in 1829 became the first European explorer to venture into the Darling Scarp.

See also

Mount Cooke
Mount Gunjin

Notes

References

WalkGPS.com: Mount Dale-Beraking Brook Walk (Walk #12)

Dale
Fire lookout towers in Australia
Darling Range